Henrique Santos may refer to:

 Henrique Santos (runner) (1908-1981), Portuguese middle-distance runner
 Henrique Santos (footballer) (born 1990), Brazilian footballer